The East Over Reservation is a  nature preserve and working farm in Rochester, Massachusetts, USA, and is managed by the Trustees of Reservations. There are hiking trails, quarry-stone walls and a "treasure hunt", designed to test one's map reading skills. It was protected between 2003 and 2005.

References

External links 
 East Over Reservation
 East Over: Hales Brook and Sippican River
 Trail map

The Trustees of Reservations
Open space reserves of Massachusetts
Protected areas of Plymouth County, Massachusetts
Protected areas established in 2003
2003 establishments in Massachusetts